Tyler Jack Cordner (born 4 December 1998) is an English professional footballer who plays for  club Aldershot Town, as a central defender.

Career

AFC Bournemouth
Born in Southampton, Cordner began his career at Bournemouth. He spent the 2018–19 season on loan at Havant & Waterlooville, and moved on loan to  Ebbsfleet United in September 2019, returning to Bournemouth in January 2020. He signed on loan for Scunthorpe United in August 2020. He scored his first goal for Scunthorpe in an EFL Trophy tie against Lincoln City on 8 September 2020. After being recalled by Bournemouth on 14 January, he moved on loan to Southend United later that month.

Weymouth
In July 2021, following his release from Bournemouth, Cordner joined National League side Weymouth. He made 41 league appearances and scored three goals during the 2021–22 season. On 16 June 2022, it was confirmed that Cordner had left Weymouth following their relegation to the National League South that season.

Aldershot Town
On 16 June 2022, it was announced that Cordner had joined Aldershot Town of the National League on a two-year contract.

Career statistics

References

1998 births
Living people
English footballers
AFC Bournemouth players
Havant & Waterlooville F.C. players
Ebbsfleet United F.C. players
Scunthorpe United F.C. players
Southend United F.C. players
Weymouth F.C. players
Aldershot Town F.C. players
National League (English football) players
English Football League players
Association football defenders